Deer Park School District may refer to:
 Deer Park School District (New York)
 Deer Park School District (Washington)
 Deer Park Independent School District (Texas)